The Order of the Falcon is the only order of chivalry in Iceland, founded by King Christian X of Denmark and Iceland on 3 July 1921. The award is awarded for merit for Iceland and humanity and has five degrees. Nowadays, appointments are made on the nomination of the President of Iceland and that of a "five-member council."

History and appointments
Christian X, the King of Denmark, ruled Iceland until 17 June 1944. During his royal visit to Iceland in 1921, King Christian X issued the royal decree founding the Icelandic Order of the Falcon. When Iceland became a republic, new statutes were incorporated for the Order on 11 July 1944. The Republic of Iceland replaced the King by an elected President of Iceland who is the designated Grand Master of this Order. It may be awarded to both Icelanders and citizens of other countries for achievements in Iceland or internationally. A five-member council makes recommendations on awards to the Grand Master, who then grants the award. However, the Grand Master may award the Order without recommendations from the Order Council. The Grand Master and the Chairman of the Order Council then sign the Letters Patent, which is given to those who receive the awards.

Classes

The Order has five classes:

 Collar with Grand Cross Breast Star (Keðja ásamt stórkrossstjörnu), only for heads of state
 Grand Cross (Stórkross)
 Grand Knight's Cross with Star (Stórriddarakross með stjörnu)
 Grand Knight's Cross (Stórriddarakross)
 Knight's Cross (Riddarakross)

Insignia

The collar is gilded metal; it consists of links bearing the Icelandic coat-of-arms and blue-enamelled discs bearing the white falcon.

The badge consists of a gilt cross, enamelled in white, with a blue-enamelled central disc bearing the white falcon.

The star is a silver, eight-pointed star. For the Grand Cross class it has the badge of the Order superimposed upon it. For the Grand Knight with Star class it has a blue-enamelled central disc bearing the white falcon.

The ribbon is blue with white-red-white border stripes. It is worn on the left shoulder.

In summary: 
 Collar with Grand Cross Breast Star – wears the badge on a collar plus a star on the left chest;
 Grand Cross – wears the badge on a sash on the left shoulder, plus a star on the left chest;
 Grand Knight's Cross with Star – wears the badge on a necklet, plus a star on the left chest;
 Grand Knight's Cross – wears the badge on a necklet;
 Knight's Cross – wears the badge on a chest ribbon.

If a holder is promoted to a higher rank, the lower rank's insignia must be returned. The insignia is retained during the recipient's lifetime, but it must be returned to the Icelandic Government upon his or her death.

Notable recipients

Politicians and heads of state 
  Guðni Th. Jóhannesson (current President of Iceland )
 Guðni Ágústsson (former Minister of Agriculture)
 Jóhannes Jóhannesson (First Chairman of the order council)
  Ólafur Ragnar Grímsson (former President of Iceland)
  Vigdís Finnbogadóttir (former president of Iceland; first popularly elected female president in the world)
  Lennart Meri (former President of Estonia )
  Dalia Grybauskaitė (former President of Lithuania )
  Sauli Niinistö (current President of Finland )
  Tarja Halonen (former President of Finland )
  Martti Ahtisaari (former President of Finland )
  Mauno Koivisto (former President of Finland )
  Urho Kekkonen (former President of Finland )
  Juho Kusti Paasikivi (former President of Finland )
  Kyösti Kallio (former President of Finland )
  Frank-Walter Steinmeier (current President of Germany )
  Prince Philip, Duke of Edinburgh (Awarded 1963), Royal Consort of Elizabeth II
  Elizabeth II (Queen of the United Kingdom and the other Commonwealth realms )
  Princess Beatrix of the Netherlands
  Carl XVI Gustav (King of Sweden )
  Silvia (Queen of Sweden )
  Victoria, Crown Princess of Sweden
  Prince Daniel, Duke of Västergötland
  Prince Carl Philip, Duke of Värmland
  Princess Sofia, Duchess of Värmland
  Princess Christina, Mrs. Magnuson
  Albert II (King of Belgium )
  Juan Carlos I of Spain (former King of Spain )
  Sofía (former Queen of Spain )
  Infanta Elena, Duchess of Lugo
  Infanta Cristina of Spain
  Margrethe II (Queen of Denmark )
  Frederik, Crown Prince of Denmark
  Mary, Crown Princess of Denmark
  Prince Joachim of Denmark
  Princess Marie of Denmark
  Princess Benedikte of Denmark
  Harald V (King of Norway )
  Sonja (Queen of Norway )
  Haakon, Crown Prince of Norway
  Mette-Marit, Crown Princess of Norway
  Princess Märtha Louise of Norway
  Princess Astrid, Mrs. Ferner
  Janis Johnson (Canadian Senator, Manitoba) Awarded 2000
  Lisa Murkowski (United States Senator, Alaska)

Artists and entertainers 

  Björk (singer, songwriter), 1997
  Helga Bachmann (actress)
  Ólöf Pálsdóttir (sculptor), 1970
  Steinunn Thorarinsdottir (sculptor)
  Vladimir Ashkenazy  (pianist, conductor)
  Stefán Karl Stefánsson (actor, singer), 2018
  Edda Björgvinsdóttir (actress), 2018
  Nína Dögg Filippusdóttir (actress), 2023
  Erling Bløndal Bengtsson (Cellist)
  Brad Leithauser (writer, poet, scholar), awarded 2005.
  Victor Borge (Børge "Victor" Rosenbaum) (concert pianist, entertainer)
  Þorkell Sigurbjörnsson, Icelandic composer, awarded 1993.
  Jónas Jónasson (composer, radio host), 2006

Scholars 

 George P. L. Walker (Volcanologist)
  Andrew Wawn (Philologist)
  Thorbergur Thorvaldson, cement chemist, awarded 1939.
  Unnur Anna Valdimarsdóttir, Professor of Epidemiology, University of Iceland, awarded 2023.
  A. R. Taylor, Professor of medieval English, Old Norse and modern Icelandic Studies, University of Leeds, awarded 1963
  Rory McTurk, Professor of Icelandic Studies, University of Leeds, awarded 2007
  Mark Watson , archaeologist, dog breeder and benefactor, awarded 1965
  William Paton Cleland (Surgeon) 
  Anders Grubb, Professor of Clinical Chemistry, University of Lund, awarded 2007 for research on Icelandic hereditary diseases
  John Lindow, Professor Emeritus of Old Norse and Folklore at University of California, Berkeley, awarded 2018 for scholarly contributions in the area of Icelandic medieval literature.
  Carol J. Clover, Professor of Medieval Studies (Early Northern Europe) and American Film at the University of California, Berkeley.
  Lee M. Hollander, translator of Kierkegaard and academic.
  Sigrún Árnadóttir, awarded the Knight's Cross for the translation of several books to Icelandic including Alfie Atkins and for her contributions to Icelandic children's culture.

Other 
  Pike Ward, fisherman who started and developed the Icelandic fishing industry, awarded 1936.
  Iceland men's national handball team (Silver medalists in handball at the 2008 Summer Olympics)
  Hilmar Örn Hilmarsson (chief goði of the Ásatrúarfélagið), 2018
  Friðrik Skúlason (computer scientist), 2018
  David Architzel (Vice Admiral, US Navy)
  Guðmundur Kjærnested (Commander, Icelandic Coast Guard)
  Orri Vigfússon (Chairman of the North Atlantic Salmon Fund)
  Anna Kisselgoff (Columbia Univ.) Awarded 2002
  James L. Kauffman, Vice-admiral during World War II 
  William S. Key, Major General during World War II 
  Sir Arthur Young , police officer
  Antti Tuuri (Writer) translated some Icelandic sagas
  Koča Popović (Colonel General, YPA )
  John W. White, USAF General, Commander Iceland Defense Force
  Signy Stefansson Eaton, socialite and philanthropist of Icelandic descent

Notes

External links
 The Collection of Henrik Revens Website features orders and medals of Iceland as well as other Nordic countries

Order of the Falcon
Icelandic culture
Falcon
Orders, decorations, and medals of Iceland
Falcon, Order of the
Awards established in 1921
1921 establishments in Iceland